The folklore of Romania is the collection of traditions of the Romanians. A feature of Romanian culture is the special relationship between folklore and the learned culture, determined by two factors. First, the rural character of the Romanian communities resulted in an exceptionally vital and creative traditional culture. Folk creations (the best known is the ballad Miorița) were the main literary genre until the 18th century. They were both a source of inspiration for cultivated creators and a structural model. Second, for a long time learned culture was governed by official and social commands and developed around courts of princes and boyars, as well as in monasteries.

Overview

Creation of the world
Stories suggest God made the earth with the help of animals, while the Devil was trying to thwart his plans. In the majority of versions, before the earth existed, a boundless ocean called Apa Sâmbetei was the abode of God and the Devil, seen as master and servant rather than equals. In these stories the Devil goes by the name "Nefârtatul" and is the somewhat foolish brother of God in folk versions of stories. These stories appear not only in Romanian folklore, but also in those of Aromanian, Slavic Macedonian and Bulgarian folklore. The Devil set forth and tried to bring it to the surface in his name instead, but could not succeed until he brought it up in the name of God. As this piece of clay grew into the earth, God laid himself down to sleep. The Devil tried to push him over the side, but the ever-expanding earth would hinder that. After trying to throw God off the earth in every one of the four cardinal directions, he shied away from the cross he drew in the ground himself.

Origin of evil
Other accounts, closer to the biblical one, suggest that the Devil and his demons were once angels of God. The Devil, however, tried to rebel, and, in response, God opened up the heavens so that he might fall to the earth. Fearing that Heaven might be voided, the archangel Michael re-sealed it, thus freezing the demons that had not yet fallen to hell in place. This is related to the concept of soul customs, where every soul is intercepted on its way to heaven by these demons, who force it into hell. It has also given rise to the Romanian saying până ajungi la Dumnezeu, te mănâncă sfinţii ("before you reach God, the saints will eat you").

Origin of God
Another question commonly addressed is that of the origin of God, which is explained in a Russian doll-type fashion; before every God there was another God that created him. Thus explaining the many names the Bible used for God, the Oltenians believed the first God was called Sabaoth, followed by Amon, Apollo, the Creator God of the Bible and, finally, Jesus Christ.

The Earth
Even after Christian imagery and symbolism became part of Romanian culture, Mother Earth is identified as the consort of God, the heavenly Father.

The origin of mountains is explained in a number of ways by the cultures of the different regions of Romania. One account is that mountains formed as a response to God demanding the Earth to nurture all life, to which the earth shuddered and brought forth mountains. Another version suggests the Earth was too large to fit under the firmament, and so God attempted to shrink it, thus raising mountains. Often, these accounts are accompanied by the imagery of one or several World Pillars, which sustain the earth from below and are usually placed beneath mountains. Earthquakes are frequently attributed to the earth slipping due to the Devil's constant gnawing at these pillars, which are rebuilt by God and his angels in times of fasting.

The myth of the Blajini
The etymology of the word blajin (adj.) is the Slavonian blažĕnŭ meaning 'kind, well-minding person'. According to Christian calendar, Romanians from Banat, Transylvania, Bucovina and Maramureș counties celebrate Easter of Blajini on first Monday after St. Thomas Sunday. Easter of Blajini is called also Easter of Deaths or Mighty Easter.
Romanians generally perceived the earth as a disc, and they imagined what existed on the other side. This other earth is imagined as a mirror image of our own, and as a home to creatures called Blajini  ("gentle/kind-hearted ones"), sometimes given the name Rohmani  in Bucovina. They are described as anthropomorphic and short, sometimes having the head of a rat. They are either described as malicious or as having great respect for God and leading a sinless life. They are considered to fast the year through, and thus doing humans a great service.

The Romanian holiday Paştele Blajinilor (Easter of Blajini) is a way to repay them for the benefits they bring. Since they live in isolation, they have no way of knowing when Easter comes. It is for this reason that Romanians eat dyed eggs and let the shells flow downstream, from there they believe they will get to the Apa Sâmbetei, and from there to the Blajini. Blajini are invisible connectors between Inner and Hollow Earth.

Blajin also means a dead child who did not receive the benediction of Holy Spirit. The ethnograph Marian Simion Florea wrote : Blajini are fictitious beings, incarnations of dead children not baptized who live at the end of Earth, nearby The Holy water (of Saturday).
Some explain them as the descendants of Adam's son Seth. Others think that they used to live alongside humans on the earth, but Moses, seeing his people oppressed by them, split the waters and, after he and his people had retreated to safety, poured the waters back onto them, sending them to their current abode.

For celebrating the souls of dead relatives or friends, Romanians from above mentioned counties prepare festive meals and offer them, in the cemetery, nearby the tombs, after the religious mass and benediction, to all who wished to commemorate and pay their respects to the dead. They cheer up in memory of the deceased.

Eschatology
The most prominent symbol associated with the End Times is that of the earthquake. Waters overflowing and mountains collapsing are both linked to these earthquakes, which are mainly caused by lack of faith, which accelerates the crumbling of the World Pillars. Others attribute the earthquakes to the earth (which is alive, and can therefore feel) realising the wicked ways of humans, and trembling in fright. Other rare natural phenomena such as Eclipses or Comets were seen as a sign of impending doom.

If these warnings should fail, God will initiate the End of the World. Such imagery as a darkened sun, a bleeding moon and falling stars are associated with the beginning of the End Times. Three saints (usually in the persons of Enoch, John and Elijah) are said to come to earth to unveil the Devil's attempts to destroy the world, whereupon they shall be killed by decapitation. The sky and the earth will be set alight and the earth will be purged, so that its Creator may descend upon it. The 12 winds are said to sweep up the ashes of people and gather them in the valley of Safed, where the Last Judgement shall be done.

Sources form Moldova and Bucovina also speak of a great army led by the emperor Constantine, which will conquer all the world's states, and kill everyone save for a few pure ones, which will then repopulate the earth. In another instance, should this army not come, God shall burn the earth as described and bring the Blajini to live there. In another version, true to the succession of Gods mentioned earlier (s. here), Jesus Christ is said to come and create a new world like his father before him. A not-so-widespread belief is that of a definitive destruction of the earth, whereupon God and the Devil shall divide the souls of the dead among themselves and retire to the moon, who is considered to have been made in the image of the earth to serve a place of retreat after the destruction of the earth.

Characteristics
Strong folk traditions have survived to this day due to the rural character of the Romanian communities, which has resulted in an exceptionally vital and creative traditional culture. Romania's rich folk traditions have been nourished by many sources, some of which predate the Roman occupation. Traditional folk arts include wood carving, ceramics, weaving and embroidery of costumes, household decorations, dance, and richly varied folk music. Ethnographers have tried to collect in the last two centuries as many elements as possible: the Museum of the Romanian Peasant and the Romanian Academy are currently the main institutions which systematically organise the data and continue the research.

Wood used to be the main construction material, and heavily ornamented wooden objects were common in old houses. In Maramureș, wood was used to create impressive structures such as churches or gates; in Dobruja, windmills were made of wood, and in mountainous regions hardwood was used even for covering the roof. To preserve traditional houses, many village museums have been created in the last century throughout Romania, such as the Village Museum in Bucharest, the Traditional Popular Civilisation ASTRA Museum in Sibiu or the Oltenian Village Museum in Râmnicu Vâlcea.

Linen was the most common material for clothing, combined with wool during the winter or colder periods. These are embroidered with traditional motifs that vary from region to region. Black is the most common colour used, but red and blue are predominant in certain areas. Traditionally, men wore a white shirt and pants (if made of wool they are called iţari) with a wide leather belt, usually over the shirt, and a vest sometimes made of leather and embroidered. They wore either boots or a simple shoe made of leather and tied around the foot called opincă and they wore a hat which differs in design from region to region. Women also wore a white skirt and a shirt with a vest. They wore an apron called şorţ or cătrinţă which is also embroidered and a headscarf called basma;on special occasions they wore more elaborate outfits.

Music and dance represent a lively part of the Romanian folklore and there are a great variety of musical genres and dances. Party music is very lively and shows both Balkan and Hungarian influences. Sentimental music, however, is the most valued, and Romanians consider their doina (a sad song either about one's home or about love, composed like an epic ballad) unique in the world. Maria Tănase is considered to be one of the greatest Romanian folk singers and today Grigore Leşe and Taraful Haiducilor are two of the most famous musicians. The dances are lively and are practiced throughout Romania by a large number of professional and amateur groups, thus keeping the tradition alive; Hora is one of the most famous group dances but men's folk dances such as căluşari are extremely complex and have been declared by UNESCO to be "Masterpieces of the Oral and Intangible Heritages of Humanity".

Romanians have had, from time immemorial, a myriad of customs, tales and poems about love, faith, kings, princesses, and witches. Ethnologists, poets, writers and historians have tried in recent centuries to collect and to preserve tales, poems, ballads and have tried to describe as well as possible the customs and habits related to different events and times of year. Customs related to certain times of year are the colinde - Romanian Christmas carols, sorcova on New Year's Eve or the Mărţişor custom on the 1st of March marking the spring. Other customs are presumably of pre-Christian pagan origin, like the Paparuda rain enchanting custom in the summer, or the masked folk theatre or Ursul (the bear) and Capra (the goat) in winter.

Perhaps the most successful collector of folk tales was the novelist and storyteller Ion Creangă, who, in very picturesque language, shaped into their now-classic form stories like Harap Alb (roughly, "The White Moor") or Fata babei şi fata moşului ("The old woman's daughter and the old man's daughter"). Also, the poet Vasile Alecsandri published the most successful version of the ballad Mioriţa (The Little Ewe), a sad, philosophical poem, centered on a simple action: the plot by two shepherds to kill a third shepherd because they envied his wealth. Another prolific editor of folk tales was Petre Ispirescu, who, in the 19th century published an impressive number of volumes containing a large number of short novels and tales from popular mythology. They are centered on popular characters like the prince Făt-Frumos (the Romanian "Prince Charming"), the princess Ileana Cosânzeana, the villain or monster Zmeu or Căpcăun, the dragon Balaur or fantastic superbeings like the good Zână and the evil Muma Pădurii.' Places 

 Apa Sâmbetei
 Apa Vie/Apa Moartă
 Sorbul Pǎmântului
 Tărâmul Celălalt (Hollow Earth, direct translation: The other Realm)

 Folk tales 

 Mioriţa
 Meşterul Manole
 Babele
 Verea Viteazul

 Romanian myths part of international culture 

 Vampire - See strigoi and moroi, which are more phantom- or wizard-like creatures.
 Werewolf (vârcolac)
 Şobolan - A giant rat similar to the South American capybara. Rural Romanian folklore tends to attribute the şobolan human characteristics.
 Solomonar - See Hultan and Solomonari, who were a group of nobles and wizards, made famous more by their families' high social status, than for their deeds.  However, this is mainly due to the massive crusades of Christianity and the attempt to destroy all the historic tradition of these Wizards.  Some of these are Dracula Vlad, Solomon, Despina the Impure, Ty'ere, Ventruszch, Brohmyr, Izhain and Vohc.

Most of these names can be found in the Romanian Lore in reference to Vampires and Dragons.

 Rituals 

 Dragobete (Romanian folklore similar to Valentine's Day)
 Caloian
 Paparuda
 Star boys' singing procession

 Fairy tales 

 "The Boys with the Golden Stars" 
 "The 12 Sisters and the Demon Bride"
 "Seventh son of a seventh son"
 "Let Thee Be Marked in Magic"
 "Harap Alb's story"
 "Greuceanu"
 "Youth Without Aging and Life Without Death"
 "Trandafiru"

 Characters in folk literature 

 Baba Cloanța (similar to Muma Pădurii)
 Baba Dochia
 Calul năzdrăvan (similar to Pegasus, direct translation: The Marvellous Horse)
 Căţelul Pământului
 Cotoroanță (similar to Muma Pădurii)
 Fata Pădurii
 Faurul Pământului (Blacksmith of Earth)
 Ileana Cosânzeana
 Luceafăr - similar to Planet Venus
 Marțolea (Demon of Tuesday)
 Moşul (the old man)
 Muma Pădurii
 Murgilă
 Rohmani (or Blajini)
 Samca
 Solomonari
 Uniilă (a devil )
 Ursitoare - similar to the Fates
 Vâlva
 Zburător
 Zorilă

 Heroes 

 Ber-Căciulă
 Doamna Neaga
 Făt-Frumos
 Ileana Cosânzeana
 Greuceanu
 Iovan Iorgovan
 Ler Împărat
 Baba Novac
 Păcală
 Prâslea cel voinic (Prâslea the Sturdy)

 Creatures 

 Balaur (giant dragon with seven heads)
Baubau, variant form Babau (similar to the Bogeyman)
 Căpcăun (an ogre)
 Corcoaia (similar to Lernaean Hydra)
 Dragon
 Iele
 Moroi (a type of vampire)
 Nemorți (similar to zombi)
 Pricolici (a werewolf or demon)
 Sânziana (or Drăgaică)
 Scorpie (Chimera)
 Spiriduş (a sprite)
 Stafie - similar to Ghost
 Strigoi (a vampire or zombie)
 Uriaş - similar to Giant
 Vasilisc - similar to Basilisk
 Vântoase (spirits of the wind)
 Vârcolac (werewolf)
 Zână (fairy)
 Zgripțor (similar to Griffin)
 Zmeu

 List of folk dances 

 Bătute
 Brâul, Sesh dance
 Buciumeana, hornpipe dance
 Căluşari (Călus, Căluşul)
 Ciuleandra
 Hora, a circle dance
 Geamparale
 Joc
 Joc cu bâta (Jocul cu bâta), Joc with stick
 Mărunţel
 Periniţa, translated as "Little pillow", a dance of wedding traditions, a.k.a. Handkerchief Joc
 Pe loc, "On Spot", a stomping dance
 Poarga românescă (Romanian polka)
 Sârba
 Tropotiţe

 Banat plain 

 Sorocul de la Beregsaul Mare
 Sorocul de la Jebel
 Pe loc ca la Murava
 Pe loc a lui lefta Lupu
 Intoarsa

 Banat mountain 

 Briu Batrin
 Ardeleana de la Rugi
 Ardeleana Baba Peleaga
 Ardeleana ca pe Valea Almajului
 Doiul roata de la Glimboca
 De doi ca la Caransebes

 Moldova 

 Moldova
 Bătrânesca din Bucovina
 Arcanul
 Arcanul Bătrânesc
 Bătuta
 Hora Câmpulungului
 Hora de la Munte
 Raţa
 Hora miresei (translated as "Bride's Hora")
 Batuta de la Tudora
 Batuta de la Vorona

 Oltenia 

 Alunelul de la Goicea
 Sârba Căluşerească
 Sârba Oltenească
 Trei Păzeşte de la Bistreţ
 Trei Păzeşte de la Dolj
 Bobocica
 Boiereasca
 Alunelul
 Briuletul
 Hora mare
 Galaonul

 Bihor 

 Polca
 Pe picior

 Nasaud 

 De-a lungul
 Barbuncul
 Învârtita (a Romanian-style square dance, done mainly throughout the Romanian Transylvania region, which also includes Nasaud.)

 Transylvania 

 Crihalma
 Fecioreasca
 De-a Lungul
 Joc în Patru
 Oaş Dance
 Sârba Sita Buzălilui

 References 

Further reading

 Ciubotaru, Silvia. "Mituri pluviale româneşti în context universal". [Romanian Pluvial Myths In a World Wide Context]. In: Anuarul Muzeului Etnografic al Moldovei [The Yearly Review of the Ethnographic Museum of Moldavia]. 15/2015. pp. 135–168. .
 Ciubotaru, Silvia. "Trăgătorii cu coarne aurite între cotidian şi mitologie" [Golden Horn Plough Pulling Animals Between Everyday Life and Mythology]. In: Anuarul Muzeului Etnografic al Moldovei [The Yearly Review of the Ethnographic Museum of Moldavia] 16/2016. pp. 143–176. .
 Ittu, Constantin. "De la tipologia folcloristului finlandez Antti Amatus Aarne la universul basmului românesc văzut de etnologul Adolf Schullerus" [From the typology of the Finnish folklorist Antti Amatus Aarne to the universal Romanian tale as seen by the ethnologist Adolf Schullerus]. In: STUDII ŞI COMUNICĂRI DE ETNOLOGIE XXXI/2017, Issue No. 31, pp. 167–183.
 Lefter, Lucian-Valeriu. "Din „senin de apă”: Facerea Lumii" [“Out of Infinite Clear Waters”: The Genesis]. In: Anuarul Muzeului Etnografic al Moldovei [The Yearly Review of the Ethnographic Museum of Moldavia] 20/2020. pp. 481–488.
 Oișteanu, Andrei. Motive și semnificaţii mito-simbolice în cultura tradițională românească [Mytho-Symbolical Motifs and Meanings in Romanian Traditional Culture]. Bucharest: Minerva Publishing House, 1989.
 Saineanu, Lazar. Basmele române: în comparatiune cu legendele antice clasice și în legătură cu basmele popoarelor învecinate și ale tuturor popoarelor romanice: studiu comparativǔ''. București: Göbl, 1895.

See also 

 Christmas in Romania
 Culture of Romania
 Religion in Romania